Thoorpu Padamara is a 1976 Indian Telugu-language romantic drama film written and directed by Dasari Narayana Rao. A remake of the Tamil film Apoorva Raagangal (1975), it revolves around a rebel (Narasimha Raju) who falls in love with a much older woman (Srividya) while the woman's daughter (Madhavi) is drawn to the rebel's father (Kaikala Satyanarayana). The rest of the story revolves around the four characters and their problems. The film was released on 23 October 1976 and became a commercial success.

Plot 

Suryam, a young rebel, is nursed back to health by a lonely classical singer Shivaranjani, who is significantly older than him. Though the two fall in love and want to be together, they find many obstacles in their paths.

Cast 
 Narasimha Raju as Suryam
 Srividya as Shivaranjani
 Madhavi as Kalyani
 Kaikala Satyanarayana as Suryam's father
 Mohan Babu as Shivaranjani's ex-husband
 Nagesh as Shivaranjani's family doctor
 C. Narayana Reddy as himself
Murali Mohan as himself

Production 
Thoorpu Padamara, a remake of K. Balachander's Tamil film Apoorva Raagangal (1975), was written and directed by Dasari Narayana Rao. It was produced by K. Raghava under Pratap Art Productions, photographed by K. S. Mani and edited by K. Balu. Srividya and Nagesh reprised their roles from the Tamil original.

Themes 
Thoorpu Padamara, like Narayana Rao's other films, explores "human relation dynamics". According to Sridhar Sattiraju of Telugu360, the entire story can be summed in one of the film's dialogues which translates to: "Why the ‘Twain shall never meet, conveyed the essence of what happens when improbable relationships exist between say, a father-in-law and a daughter-in-law or say, a mother-in-law and son-in-law".

Soundtrack 
The soundtrack was composed by Ramesh Naidu, and the lyrics were written by C. Narayana Reddy. Instead of reusing the songs from Apoorva Raagangal, Naidu was given freedom by Narayana Rao to compose original songs.

Release 
Thoorpu Padamara was released on 23 October 1976, and became a commercial success.

References

External links 
 

1976 romantic drama films
1970s Telugu-language films
Films about singers
Films directed by Dasari Narayana Rao
Indian romantic drama films
Sexuality and age in fiction
Telugu remakes of Tamil films